In 2019 the South African National Defence Force (SANDF) renamed 52 of its 66 army's Reserve Force units.  The changes were made to include more indigenous African references in the unit names, which had previously had a colonial and apartheid-era influence.  The SANDF's Name Review Steering Committee led the process in consultation with the units, past members and communities.  Name suggestions came from the units, with the army's director of reserves, Brigadier General Gerhard Kamffer providing a list of suggestions.  Of the renamed units 26 took names relating to indigenous African military history and 25 took names relating to the apartheid and colonial era.  Units were initially given three years to transition their insignia to the new names; this was later extended to 31 April 2023. One unit scheduled to change its name, the Cape Town Highlanders, is thought to have been granted permission to abandon the move in 2022.

Background 
Many units of the South African National Defence Force's Reserve Force had ancestry dating back to the British colonial era (including units of the Union Defence Force) and the apartheid-era South African Defence Force. The names of these units reflected this heritage including many named in or after 1934 for Boer generals.

A process of assessing the names of the units was begun by then chief of the South African Army Lieutenant General Vusumuzi Masondo in 2013.  The intention was to include more indigenous African influence in the unit names.  The names of 66 reserve units were reviewed and it was determined that 52 should be changed.

Renaming 
The process of renaming was overseen by the Name Review Steering Committee.  The process involved three rounds of consultation with serving soldiers, unit commanders, regimental councils (consisting of current and former members), regimental associations of past members, town councils and communities associated with the units.  The units were asked to suggest potential new names.  They were assisted by a list of names drawn up under the oversight of the director of reserves, Brigadier General Gerhard Kamffer.  The list comprised names of South African military personalities, battles and events from across a range of eras, cultures and regions.  The list was inspired partly by a 1983 anti-apartheid poster by Thamsanga Mnyele that depicted black South African figures such as Shaka, Sol Plaatje, Moshoeshoe I and Maqoma.

Units were not permitted to be named after living persons.  Major General Roy Andersen, Chief Defence Reserves of the SANDF said "the names created are to uphold their heritage and to be attractive to the youth of today".  Many geographical locations in South Africa have been renamed since 1994 by the South African Geographical Names Council, often those named after British or Boer military personnel.  In many cases where reserve units were named after these locations their name was not updated.  The units with geographical names were asked to consider not merely updating their names but to consider a name taken from South African military history.

The names suggested by the units were reviewed by the committee, which was led by Kamffer.  Where the committee was not satisfied the unit was asked to suggest another name, though this happened only on two occasions.  When the process was completed 25 of the renamed units were named after indigenous African military history, with 15 names linked to the anti-apartheid campaign.  Some 26 of the new unit names were associated with so-called "statutory" military history of the apartheid and colonial era.  Three units were given names relating to anti-apartheid leader and first black president Nelson Mandela and two were named after Sekhukhune, king and military leader of the Pedi people in the 19th century. The South African army's Natal Carbineers were renamed the Ingobamakhosi Carbineers after a Zulu regiment that had fought against them at the 1879 Battle of Isandlwana.

The renamed units retained the battle honours of their predecessors.  Units that had a traditional association with Scotland or Ireland (and so included "Scottish", "Irish" or "Highland" in their names) were encouraged to reuse the former name in a sub-unit which could continue the traditions, dress and music associated with these countries. Unit colours, insignia (such as cap badges and shoulder flashes) and associated symbols were initially allowed to remain unchanged, with units having three years to phase in new ones.

Impact 
The change led some units to parade without insignia and, in the case of a Johannesburg regiment, without uniform, as unit commanders chose not to use the old equipment.  The change led to the loss of historically unique uniforms, such as that of the Transvaal Scottish, where sub-units did not carry on the traditional dress.  The old colours of the units were sent to museums as they were replaced by new colours for the new unit names.  The date for transitioning to new insignia was extended in 2022 to 31 April 2023.

The name changes are estimated to have cost the SANDF 8 million rand.  In 2019 the SANDF said the new unit names had been well-received by serving soldiers.  At the time of the change Democratic Alliance MP Kobus Marais raised concerns that the changes were made purely for political reasons and that the changes would result in lower recruitment rates for the units.  In June 2022 it was noted that the Cape Town Highlanders, founded in 1885 as the first Highland regiment in the southern hemisphere and scheduled to be renamed the Gonnema Regiment, had yet to change their name and press reports suggested they had been permitted to retain their previous name.

List of changed unit names 
The renaming is as per the DefenceWeb report of 7 August 2019; additional details on namesakes are cited inline.  Units that were not renamed in 2019 include the Rand Light Infantry, Umvoti Mounted Rifles, Johannesburg Regiment, Kimberley Regiment and the Tshwane Regiment.

Infantry

Artillery

Air defence artillery

Armoured

Engineer

Signals

Support units

Notes

References 

Military of South Africa
Anti-racism in South Africa
Naming controversies